Khuresh may refer to:
 Khuresh, Qazvin
 Khuresh, Razavi Khorasan